A Classical (stylized as  Classical) is an orchestral compilation album by Ayumi Hamasaki, released January 8, 2013 by Avex Trax. The album consists of  classical arrangements of her past works, rearranged by Kousuke Yamashita. It was released on January 8, 2013.

The album was the third of five releases by Hamasaki in commemoration of the fifteenth anniversary of her music career. Its cover is a hand-drawn illustration of Hamasaki's Love EP cover made by a fan from Pixiv and Kaikai Kiki. No singles or new tracks were released to promote A Classical.

A Classical entered the Oricon album chart at number one with first-week sales of over 25,000 copies, becoming the first classical album to do so; however, it went on to sell only 30,000 copies in Japan.

15th Anniversary

A Classical is the third of five releases by Hamasaki in celebration of her 15th anniversary in music industry. It contains 10 rearranged tracks, out of which 7 were chosen by Team Ayu members in November 2012.

Track listing

Oricon sales chart

References

2013 compilation albums
Ayumi Hamasaki remix albums
Avex Group albums
2013 remix albums